The Wingless Victory is a 1936 three-act tragedy written by Maxwell Anderson, set in the year 1800. It was produced on Broadway by Katharine Cornell and staged by Guthrie McClintic, running for 110 performances from December 23, 1936, to March 1937 at the Empire Theatre. Jo Mielziner created the scenic and costume design.

Cast
 Mary Michael as A Girl
 Kent Smith as Reverend Phineas McQueston
 Arthur Chatterton as Jared Mungo
 John Winthrop as Winston Urquhart and Harry
 Effie Shannon as Mrs. McQueston
 Myron McCormick as Ruel McQueston
 Lois Jameson as Venture
 Ruth Matteson as Faith Ingalls
 Barry Kelley as Happy Penny
 Theodora Pleadwell as Letty
 Walter Abel as Nathaniel McQueston
 Katharine Cornell as Oparre
 Helen Zelinskaya as Toala
 Claire Howard as Durian
 Victor Colton as Van Zandt
 Franklyn Davis as Longshoreman

References

External links 
 
 Playbill

1936 plays
Broadway plays
Plays by Maxwell Anderson
Plays set in Massachusetts
Fiction set in 1800
Plays set in the 19th century